The Church of St Mary the Virgin is a 12th century English church located in Turville, Buckinghamshire, England.

History
The church is first recorded in the 12th century. It was built mainly using flint, principally due to its sole availability in the Middle Ages. The nave of the church is the oldest surviving part, dating from the early 12th century. In 1340, the present bell tower was built and the chancel was enlarged. The four bells in the tower date from 1670 and 1744. A fifth bell was added in the late 1990s for the millennium and the sixth bell was added in 2018 

Further changes to the church were made in 1733, with the addition of the north aisle, which aimed to house the pew for the Lord of the Manor, William Perry. The north aisle also includes a marble monument to William Perry. Two armorial glass windows in the south wall commemorate the connection of the Parry family with the church.

Restoration
The church was restored on numerous occasions, notably in 1875 when the chancel floor was raised, in 1901 when the vestry was constructed, in 1972 when the roof was repaired and, in 1996 with the new bell-frame and re-tuned peal. The 1901 restoration uncovered a stone coffin containing two skeletons, one dating from the 16th century which had a hole in the skull, indicating a possible murder victim. Today, the coffin stands in front of the north aisle. The coffin might have been used as an ossuary during a time when the churchyard became overcrowded.

Popular culture
The church was used in the sitcom The Vicar of Dibley, where it was used as the parish church named St Barnabas' (sic).

References

Church of England church buildings in Buckinghamshire
12th-century church buildings in England
English Gothic architecture in Buckinghamshire
Grade II* listed churches in Buckinghamshire